Lee Kang-seok (Korean: 이강석, Hanja: 李康奭, born 28 February 1985) is a South Korean speed skater. He is the 2007 and 2009 World Champion for 500 m. At the 2006 Winter Olympics, he won a bronze medal in the 500 m.  He is the second South Korean person to win a medal in an event outside of short track speedskating, and he has become a representative to show that South Korea is expanding towards cultivating their athletes to excel in sports other than short track speed skating.

On 5 March 2006, Lee won his first World Cup title, winning the 2005–06 World Cup on the 500 m. A year later, Lee won gold at the World Single Distance Championships in the Utah Olympic Oval, setting a world record time of 34.25 seconds in the second race. The record has been broken since then by Jeremy Wotherspoon on 9 November 2007, with a time of 34.03 seconds. At the 2009 Winter Universiade in Harbin, China, Lee won the 500 m, beating Yu Fengtong with times of 35.00 and 34.82.

Controversies 
Lee had his South Korean driving license revoked for driving while intoxicated on 16 June 2012. He had a blood alcohol content of 0.12%.

World record 

Source: SpeedSkatingStats.com

References

External links 
 
 Lee Kang-seok at SpeedSkatingStats.com
 Lee Kang-Seok at SpeedskatingResults.com
 
 
 
 
 

1985 births
South Korean male speed skaters
Speed skaters at the 2006 Winter Olympics
Speed skaters at the 2010 Winter Olympics
Speed skaters at the 2014 Winter Olympics
Olympic speed skaters of South Korea
Medalists at the 2006 Winter Olympics
Olympic medalists in speed skating
Olympic bronze medalists for South Korea
World record setters in speed skating
People from Uijeongbu
Living people
Asian Games medalists in speed skating
Speed skaters at the 2007 Asian Winter Games
Speed skaters at the 2011 Asian Winter Games
Medalists at the 2007 Winter Universiade
Asian Games gold medalists for South Korea
Asian Games silver medalists for South Korea
Asian Games bronze medalists for South Korea
Medalists at the 2007 Asian Winter Games
Medalists at the 2011 Asian Winter Games
Universiade medalists in speed skating
World Sprint Speed Skating Championships medalists
Universiade gold medalists for South Korea
Universiade silver medalists for South Korea
Universiade bronze medalists for South Korea
Competitors at the 2005 Winter Universiade
Speed skaters at the 2007 Winter Universiade
Competitors at the 2009 Winter Universiade
South Korean Buddhists
Sportspeople from Gyeonggi Province